Chitwoodchabaudiidae is a family of nematodes belonging to the order Rhabditida.

Genera:
 Chitwoodchabaudia Puylaert, 1970

References

Nematodes